Albert Ross may refer to:

People 
 Albert Ross (Albatros), whose name is reputed to inspire Albatros automobiles
 Albert Ross (footballer) (1916–1998), English footballer
 Albert Randolph Ross (1868–1948), American architect with widespread works
 Albert S. Ross, architect in Oklahoma, United States
 Albert Henry Ross (1881–1950), English advertising agent and freelance writer
 Albert Ross, defendant of the United States v. Ross court case
 Albert Ross, retired owner of the Ross
 Albert Ross, co-collaborator of the song, "Ahoy There!", from the Mr. Scruff album, Trouser Jazz

Other uses 
 Albert Ross, fictional character of the 1987 novel Dirk Gently's Holistic Detective Agency
 Albert Ross, fictional one-time character, portrayed by John Henshaw, of "The Heart of a Man", the television episode of Heartbeat
 "Albert Ross", song by Deviations Project from self-titled album, derivative of Fleetwood Mac song, "Albatross"
 "Albert Ross", song by Medium 21 from Killings from the Dial

See also 
 
Al Ross (disambiguation)